John Hough may refer to:
 John Hough (director) (born 1941), British film and television director
John Simpson Hough (1833-1919), American entrepreneur on the Santa Fe Trail, builder of the Baca House in Trinidad, Colorado
 John Hough (bishop) (1651–1743), English bishop

See also
 John Haugh (1930–1998), Irish hurler
 Jack Hough (1916–1971), Australian politician